Frazier (also known as Frazer) is an unincorporated community in Buchanan County, in the U.S. state of Missouri.

History
A post office called Frazer was established in 1871, and remained in operation until 1936. The community has the name of a local family.

References

Unincorporated communities in Buchanan County, Missouri
Unincorporated communities in Missouri